"Flying Away" is a song by the Italian dance singer Moony. It was released in 2003 on East West Records and Airplane Records as the third single and as well as the fourth track from her debut studio album, Lifestories (2003). It is a house song that was written by Monica Bragato, Alfredo Comazzetto, Diego Broggio and Rossano Palù and produced by Frankie Tamburo and Mauro Ferrucci.

Track listing

Charts

References

External links
 
 
 
 
 

2003 singles
2003 songs
Moony songs
East West Records singles